Symphorian Thomas Keeprath (22 April 1931, in Kadaplamattom, Kottayam, Kerala – 3 May 2015) was an Indian Roman Catholic bishop.

Ordained to the priesthood in 1958, Keeprath was appointed bishop of the Diocese of Jullundur, India in 1971 and retired in 2007.
He was the first bishop of the diocese. He was ordained as a Capuchin priest on 22 March 1958 and elevated as Bishop of Jalandhar on 6 December 1971. After 35 years of service as Bishop of Jalandhar he retired on 15 April 2007. He died due to old age on 3 May 2015 at CMC Hospital, Ludhiana.

Notes

1931 births
2015 deaths
People from Kottayam district
21st-century Roman Catholic bishops in India
20th-century Roman Catholic bishops in India